Mark Anthony John Moran ( Cole, 4 July 196415 June 2000) was an Australian organized crime figure of the infamous Moran family from Melbourne, Victoria, notable for its involvement in the illegal drug trade and the Melbourne gangland killings. Moran, aged 35, was shot dead outside his Aberfeldie home, allegedly by Carl Williams, just after 8 pm on 15 June 2000.

Personal life
Mark Moran was the son of Judy Moran and Leslie John "Johnny" Cole, who was shot dead in Sydney on 10 November 1982 during drug-related gangland wars while working for crime boss Frederick "Paddles" Anderson. His stepfather was criminal Lewis Moran and his half-brother was drug trafficker Jason Moran, both of whom were also murdered.

In popular culture
In the local Australian TV drama series Underbelly Mark Moran was played by actor Callan Mulvey. In 2014 Jake Ryan replaced Callan Mulvey as Mark Moran in Fat Tony & Co. which is a direct sequel to the first series of Underbelly.

See also

List of unsolved murders

References

1964 births
2000 deaths
Australian murder victims
Australian organised crime figures
Australian people of Irish descent
Criminals from Melbourne
Mark
Place of birth missing
Unsolved murders in Australia
Victims of the Melbourne gangland killings